The Renault Trucks D is a range of medium duty trucks for distribution manufactured by the French truckmaker Renault Trucks. It was launched in 2013 to replace the Midlum, the Premium Distribution and the Access.

Overview
 
The D incorporates automatic transmission as standard in all its versions (except the D Cab 2 m) and new comfort and security features.

The D range is made up of four models: D, D Wide, D Access and D Cab 2 m. The D and the D Wide are derived from the Midlum and the Premium Distribution respectively. The D Access is supplied by Dennis Eagle. The D Cab 2 m is a badge-engineered version of the Nissan NT500, assembled in Spain by Nissan.

Engines
The D offers two Euro 6 engines, the DTI 5 and the DTI 8. Both engines includes an EGR system to reduce NOx emissions.

Equipped with a 200-kWh battery, it has a range of "up to 200 km", though the vehicle could be presumably equipped with an even larger battery in the future.

The lighter truck of the range, the D Cab 2 m, has an engine different than the rest: a 3L engine with a power output between 

Models
The D range includes four models:
Renault Trucks D (from 10 t to 18 t, 2.1 metres wide cab)
Renault Trucks D Wide (from 16 t to 26 t, 2.3 metres wide cab)
Renault Trucks D Access (low entry cab, from 18 t to 26 t)
 Renault Trucks D Cab 2 m (from 3.5 t to 7.5 t, 2 metres wide cab)

E-Tech D

In 2022, Renault Trucks launched an electric variant.

References

D
Vehicles introduced in 2013